The History of Middle-earth is a 12-volume series of books published between 1983 and 1996 that collect and analyse much of Tolkien's legendarium, compiled and edited by his son, Christopher Tolkien. The series shows the development over time of Tolkien's conception of Middle-earth as a fictional place with its own peoples, languages, and history, from his earliest notions of a "mythology for England" through to the development of the stories that make up The Silmarillion and The Lord of the Rings. It is not a "history of Middle-earth" in the sense of being a chronicle of events in Middle-earth written from an in-universe perspective; it is instead an out-of-universe history of Tolkien's creative process. In 2000, the twelve volumes were republished in three limited edition omnibus volumes. Non-deluxe editions of the three volumes were published in 2002.

Contents

Some of the content consists of earlier versions of already published works, while other portions are new material. These books are extremely detailed, often analysing a scrap of paper to provide the full evolution of two or even three different versions of a passage that were rewritten over each other. Despite the great amount of material in the twelve volumes, numerous unpublished texts are still known to exist in the Bodleian and Marquette University libraries, and in other papers held by individuals or organizations, such as the Elvish Linguistic Fellowship.

The first five books track the early history of The Silmarillion and related texts.  Books six to nine discuss the development of The Lord of the Rings; book nine also discusses the Númenor story in the form of The Notion Club Papers. Books ten and eleven focus on material from the Silmarillion that Tolkien worked on after The Lord of the Rings was published, including the Annals of Beleriand and the Annals of Aman. Book twelve discusses the development of the Appendices to The Lord of the Rings and examines assorted writings from the last years of Tolkien's life.

Christopher Tolkien, who edited the books, made the decision not to include any material related to The Hobbit in The History of Middle-earth. His reasons for this were that it had not been intended to form part of the mythology, was a children's story, and had originally not been set in Middle-earth; it was revised during the writing of The Lord of the Rings. The History of The Hobbit was published separately, in two volumes, in 2007 and was edited by John D. Rateliff.

Volumes

A combined index was published six years after the series was completed as The History of Middle-earth: Index (2002).

A shorter version of volume 9, omitting material not related to The Lord of the Rings, was published as The End of the Third Age; this is usually sold as a boxed set along with volumes 6, 7 and 8 as The History of the Lord of the Rings.

References

Further reading

External links

 A detailed list of content in History of Middle-earth volumes and Unfinished Tales

 
Middle-earth books
Collections of works by J. R. R. Tolkien
Books about Middle-earth
Series of books
Books published posthumously
Fictional history